Kenneth Kronholm (born October 14, 1985) is an American former professional soccer player who played as a goalkeeper. The son of an American father and a German mother, Kenneth Kronholm was born in Fort Belvoir, Virginia  but grew up mostly in Heidelberg, Germany. Following a long career in Germany, he transferred to the Major League Soccer side Chicago Fire FC in 2019. Following the 2021 season, Kronholm's contract option was declined by Chicago.

Career statistics

Club

References

External links
 
 
 

1985 births
Living people
People from Fort Belvoir, Virginia
Sportspeople from Fairfax County, Virginia
Association football goalkeepers
American soccer players
German footballers
German people of American descent
Soccer players from Virginia
VfL Wolfsburg II players
FC Carl Zeiss Jena players
Fortuna Düsseldorf players
FSV Frankfurt players
FC Hansa Rostock players
SV Eintracht Trier 05 players
SV Waldhof Mannheim players
SSV Jahn Regensburg players
VfR Mannheim players
SV Elversberg players
Holstein Kiel players
Chicago Fire FC players
2. Bundesliga players
3. Liga players
Major League Soccer players